Bernardino da Martinengo (Martinengo, mid-15th century — Brescia, after 1501) was an Italian mason and architect. His appellation serves to identify his origins in Martinengo in the area of Bergamo. In 1481, he was cited as a member of a bricklayers group (paratico dei marangoni), where he learned construction techniques of the late Gothic. Towards the end of the same decade, he was registered amongst the construction workers of the Monte di Pietà vecchio, a palazzo situated in the Piazza della Loggia in Brescia, where he would be one of the accusers of Filippo Grassi, the construction manager, for fraud against the municipality.

In August 1490, he was commissioned for the construction of the new presbytery of the Old Cathedral, Brescia. He also extended the Romanesque choir in the building, and built the transept and the chapel of the Holy Crosses (now lost, after their remodelling in the 17th century). Between 1494-1495, he was involved in the construction of the Palazzo della Loggia, especially in the primary orders. In connection with this, he was sent to Padua and Venice to train himself up in structural and decorative solutions, which he would then apply to the new public building in Brescia.

Among the most interesting examples of Renaissance architecture in Brescia is the main cloister of the monastery of Saints Faustino and Giovita, which is the last known work of Bernardino, dated to 1501. No biographical evidence exists beyond this date.

References

Bibliography

15th-century Italian architects
16th-century Italian architects